Piero Domenico Angela  (22 December 1928 – 13 August 2022) was an Italian television host, science journalist, writer, and pianist.

He started as a radio reporter, then became a foreign correspondent, and established himself as the host of the RAI newscast. He is best known as the creator and presenter of broadcasting programmes modelled on BBC and David Attenborough documentaries, to whom he has been often compared, and also for his scientific journalism published in numerous publications.

Angela wrote thirty-three books, which sold over three million copies, received many honorary degrees, made over sixty documentaries and hundreds of television episodes, won seven Telegattos, and eight times won the national television directing award.

Early life
Angela was born in Turin, the son of Nella Maglia and Carlo Angela, an anti-fascist doctor, who was awarded the Medal of the Righteous Among the Nations on 29 August 2001.

At the age of one, Angela nearly died from pneumonia. Several years later, he had a broken leg reconstructed without anaesthesia and at the age of 12 underwent an appendicitis operation; the surgery went on for two and a half hours due to complications.

Angela attended the classical high school in Turin. Angela wrote that rationality was taught to him by his father. According to his colleague Gigi Marzullo "his perfect self-control and his sympathetic friendliness is a reflection of his shy nature and encoded in the genetic code of this Piedmontese education in rationality and tolerance”. Angela did well in almost all studies, but he did the minimum of work required. Angela said he received "a very Piedmontese education: very rigid, with very strict principles, including that of diffidence, never exhibiting". Angela wrote referring to his school education: "Personally, I got bored mortally in school and I was a bad student. All those involved in teaching should constantly remember the ancient Latin motto 'ludendo docere', that is, 'teach with fun'."

Music

Angela began taking private piano lessons when he was seven years old; he later developed an interest in jazz music. By 1948, he played in various jam sessions in Turin jazz clubs using the name Peter Angela.

In 1948 he was noticed by the then young entrepreneur , who invited him to play on the opening night of the Capannina in Viareggio. By the early fifties Angela formed with drummer Franco Mondini and various double bass players a jazz trio. The trio was often joined by soloists, such as Nini Rosso, Franco Pisano, Nunzio Rotondo, and the former cornetist of Duke Ellington, Rex Stewart.  Angela and Mondini played with Nunzio Rotondo's quartet for some time. He also played at this time with Franco Cerri, with whom in 1946, they would ride their bicycles to hear the concerts from outside of a Turin restaurant because they were unable to buy tickets.

Journalism 

At the end of 1951, Angela began collaborating on a programme on the history of Jazz for RAI. By 1952 he stopped playing music and began working full time as a journalist. First as reporter and contributor. Angela has spent nine years in Paris, four years in Brussels as a correspondent and toured America as a correspondent for RAI.

His wife, Margherita Pastore, gave up her career as a dancer and married Piero when she was 19, and went with Angela to Paris. According to Margherita:  "We didn't make a decision, but the strange thing that you have inside and that makes you act sometimes not completely rationally, but beautifully. That same thing that had already bewitched us at first glance, during a birthday party in the home of mutual friends." While in Paris their daughter, Christine, and son, Alberto, were born. Angela has an audio recording of the birth of his two children.

Fabiano Fabiani asked to come to Rome to work on television.  Fabiani said to Angela: "Enough with the speaking the news on radio, I want the journalists on television." In 1968 Angela was the first anchor alternating with Andrea Barbato on the National Television News at 13.30, the lunch time edition of the news.

Angela wrote 33 books which have sold over three million copies, received many honorary degrees, made about sixty documentaries and hundreds of television episodes, won seven Telegacts and eight times the national television directing award.

In 1969 Angela left RAI newscast with the idea of making longer more detailed programs: "I realised that what really interested me was doing not deal with ten news items a day, but the news for a year".

Scientific journalism 

Influenced by the documentary lesson of Roberto Rossellini, in 1968 Piero Angela produced a series of documentaries entitled The Future in Space, on the theme of the Apollo program; during the filming carried out in the United States he also made numerous live connections for RAI on the occasion of the launch of the Saturn V carrier which brought the first astronauts to the moon. Then began a long activity of scientific disclosure that in the following years led him to produce numerous information transmissions including "Destination Man" (Destinazione Uomo), "From zero to three years" (Da zero a tre anni), "Where does the world go?" (Dove va il mondo?), "In the darkness of light years" (Nel buio degli anni luce), "Critical investigation of parapsychology" (Indagine critica sulla parapsicologia), "In the cosmos in search of life" (Nel cosmo all ricerca della vita). Starting from 1971 he hosted, for Rai 1, a series of scientific TV programs about astronomy, biology, global economy, parapsychology and others.

In 1981 he started his most famous show, Quark which, as of 2022, is still active although in different forms. Quark was hosted weekly until 1983, and spawned a large number of specials and spin-offs dedicated to several scientific topics, from dinosaurs to human biology, from history to anthropology, from astronomy and cosmology to economy.

"The title is a bit curious and we borrowed it from physics, where many studies are in progress on certain hypothetical subnuclear particles called, precisely, quarks, which would be the smallest bricks of matter known so far. It is therefore an exploring into things", explained Angela during the first episode in 1981.

The Quark formula was at the time particularly innovative: all the technological means available and the resources of television communication were used to familiarise them with the topics covered: the BBC and David Attenborough documentaries, the Bruno Bozzetto cartoons used to explain the most difficult concepts, the interviews with the experts exposed in the clearest possible language compatible with the complexity of the topics, the explanations in the studio. From the basic program several spin-offs were born, some of which are still produced: naturalistic documentaries ("Special Quark" and "Il mondo di Quark"), financial ("Quark Economia") and politicians ("Quark Europa").

In 1984 Angela produced "Quark's Pills" (Pillole di Quark), a thirty-second spot on technical, scientific, educational, social, medical topics, which was broadcast at variable times on Rai1. In the same year Angela created the first talk show for mixed entertainment for scientific dissemination: six first nights live from the Foro Italico, with guests from the world of culture, science, entertainment and sport on stage to interact with the audience.

In 1995 Quark was succeeded by SuperQuark, lasting two hours instead of one. Starting from 2000, Piero Angela and his son Alberto introduced Ulisse, a monographic show dedicated to human history and discoveries.

In 1986 and 1987 he conducted two prime-time shows on climate issues from the Turin Palazzetto dello Sport in front of eight thousand spectators: atmosphere and oceans, followed by three television series that exploited new computer graphic: a journey inside the human body ("The Wonderful Machine"), in prehistory ("The Planet of the Dinosaurs"), and in space ("Journey in the Cosmos"). These series, created in collaboration with his son Alberto, were translated into English and sold in over forty European, American and Asian countries, including Arab and China countries.

In 1988 he was also involved in Italian Quark, a series of documentaries of nature, environment, exploration, animal world produced and made by Italian authors, including Alberto Angela [his son] himself, who made some documentaries in Africa.

In his autobiography he described the circumstances that led to Superquark, when in order to counter competition with Mediaset it was necessary to have a strong program in the early evening up until the Nightly Newscast. Brando Giordani, then director of RAI 1, phoned me asking me to do a "Quark" of two hours instead of one."

In fact, in 1995 Superquark was born, during which, on 4 June 1999, two thousand episodes of the Quark Project and related subsidiaries were celebrated. That same year are also the Superquark Specials, monothematic evenings on subjects of great social, psychological and scientific interest, and the collaboration in the television program Domenica in, in which Piero Angela was the anchor of a space dedicated to culture. In 1997 "Quark Atlante – Images from the planet" was born from a Quark rib.

Finally, since 2000 Piero and Alberto Angela have been authors of Ulysses, a monographic instalment program concerning historical and scientific discoveries.

Parallel to the popularising activity on television, Piero Angela has carried out publishing activities, always with information content. He has long been the editor of the "Science and Society" [Scienza e società] column in the weekly TV series, Smiles and Songs (Sorrisi e Canzoni). Angela was also the founder and supervisor of the monthly , which he founded in 2001 and dissolved in 2006 due to lack of funds. The monthly magazine, inspired by the television program dealt with scientific topics in a manner accessible to the public. Piero Angela is also the author of over thirty books, many of them translated into English, German and Spanish, with a total circulation of over three million copies.

Other activities

In 1989 Angela was one of the founders of CICAP, a scientific committee to promote scientific education and the critical thinking and devoted to verification of allegedly scientific disciplines such as parapsychology. In May 2016 he was appointed Honorary President. A slogan of the association, "We must always have an open mind, but not so open that the brain falls to the ground", has become a phrase frequently attributed to Angela, although in reality it is attributed to many people.

In 1996 the Committee for Skeptical Inquiry (CSICOP) presented Angela with the Responsibility in Journalism Award. In his program Investigation on parapsychology (1978) he revealed methods and tricks used by mediums and gurus in their activities; the interest to debunk the quackery was the basis of the birth of CICAP (Italian Committee for the Control of Claims on Pseudosciences), of which he was still honorary president.

In 2000 Piero Angela was sued for defamation by two homeopathic associations (FIAMO and SIMO in a civil case and a criminal case), following the broadcast of Superquark of 11 July 2000 in which the homeopathic medicine was said to have no scientific foundation. Angela, defended by lawyers Giulia Bongiorno and Franco Coppi, was acquitted in both cases and the judge recognized the unscientific nature of the discipline.

Angela has also written a large number of popular books, starting with L'uomo e la marionetta in 1972. Many were in collaboration with his son Alberto.

On religions and deities Angela had an agnostic approach and considered death a "nuisance".

Death
During his last years, Angela continued to work, hosting his TV program SuperQuark until 2022, when he marked 70 years of continuous activity in Rai. On 13 August 2022, Piero Angela died in Rome at the age of 93, after a long illness. His death was announced on social media by his son Alberto. After the funeral his body was cremated.

Honour
 : Commander of the Order of Merit of the Italian Republic (30 May 2001)
 : Italian Medal of Merit for Culture and Art (2 April 2002)
 : Grand Officer of the Order of Merit of the Italian Republic (26 May 2004)
 : Medal of the Algerian Revolution Friends (March 2021)
 : Knight Grand Cross of the Order of Merit of the Italian Republic (26 April 2021)

Awards 
 Angela has received many honorary degrees. In addition to numerous awards in Italy and abroad, in 1993 he received the Kalinga Award for scientific dissemination by UNESCO and in 2002 the gold medal for the culture of the Italian Republic.
 He received seven telegatti, of which one oversaw his entire career – awarded on 22 January 2008.
 On 3 October 2010 he received the Special Jury Prize of the Literary Award Giuseppe Dessì.
 The asteroid 7197 discovered by astronomers Andrea Boattini and Maura Tombelli bears his name: Pieroangela.
 There is a gastropod mollusk named Babylonia pieroangelai in his honor
 Padua, a city linked to Galileo, recognized its honorary citizenship for its "contribution of excellence given to scientific dissemination".
 Turin, his own hometown, on 23 October 2017, decided to give him honorary citizenship for "the living confirmation of the scientific tradition of the city" and having contributed with his professional career to increase "culture and knowledge" of the Italians also through the television medium ".

Academic
 Honorary degree in Natural Sciences – University of Camerino, 26 January 1988
 Honorary degree in Biology – University of Ferrara, Ferrara 15 February 1992
 Honorary degree in Biological Sciences – University of Palermo, Palermo 30 June 2001
 Honorary degree in Physics – University of Turin, Turin 23 June 2003
 Honorary degree in Veterinary Medicine – University of Bari, Bari 18 November 2004
 Honorary degree in Materials science and technology – University of Rome Tor Vergata, Rome 5 April 2016
 Honorary degree in Applied Biology and Experimental Medicine – University of Messina, Messina 24 November 2017
 Honorary Degree in Communication Science and Technology University of Siena, Siena 15 June 2019
 Honorary degree – American University of Rome, Rome
 Diploma honoris causa in Piano – International Piano Academy "Incontri da maestro", Imola

List of television programmes 
All the following programmes have been broadcast by Rai Uno.
 Il futuro nello spazio (1968)
 Destinazione uomo (1971)
 Da zero a tre anni
 Dove va il mondo?
 Nel buio degli anni luce
 Indagine sulla parapsicologia (1978)
 Nel cosmo alla ricerca della vita (1980)
 Quark (since 1981), and related sister projects:
 Pillole di Quark (since 1983)
 Il mondo di Quark (since 1984)
 Quark Economia (1986)
 Quark Europa (1986)
 Quark Speciale
 Quark Scienza
 Enciclopedia di Quark (1993)
 Superquark (since 1994)
 Speciali di Superquark (since 1999)
 La macchina meravigliosa (1990)
 Serata Oceano (1991)
 Il pianeta dei dinosauri (1993)
 Viaggio nel cosmo (1998)

Selected bibliography 
 Nel buio degli anni luce (1977)
 Nel cosmo alla ricerca della vita (1980)
 The Extraordinary Story of Human Origins (1989, with Alberto Angela)
 Da zero a tre anni (1990)
 La macchina per pensare (1990)
 The Extraordinary Story of Life on Earth (1996, with Alberto Angela)
 Sharks!: Predators of the Sea  (1997, with Alberto Angela and Alberto Luca Recchi)
Viaggio nel cosmo (1997)
Premi & punizioni. Alla ricerca della felicità (2000)
 Ti amerò per sempre. La scienza dell'amore  (2005) 
 Tredici miliardi di anni. Il romanzo dell'universo e della vita (2017)

References

External links 
 
 

1928 births
2022 deaths
Mass media people from Turin
Italian television journalists
Kalinga Prize recipients
Italian skeptics
Musicians from Turin
Grand Officers of the Order of Merit of the Italian Republic
Knights Grand Cross of the Order of Merit of the Italian Republic
Recipients of the Italian Order of Merit for Culture and Art